Lanao's at-large congressional district may refer to several instances when a provincewide at-large district was used for elections to Philippine national legislatures from the undivided province of Lanao.

The single-member district was first created ahead of the 1935 Philippine legislative election following the 1934 constitutional convention where voters had been selected in electing a delegate for the province. Lanao had been admitted as a special province under the Department of Mindanao and Sulu since 1914 but was only previously represented through a multi-member delegation appointed by the Governor General covering all of Mindanao territory except Misamis and Surigao beginning in 1916. The district encompassed the entire territory formerly known as the Lanao District that was previously organized under Moro Province in 1903 from the same Spanish politico-military district (Distrito Septimo de Lanao) that existed since the late 19th century.

Tomás Cabili of the Nacionalista Demócrata Pro-Independencia was elected as the district's first representative in 1935 by a select group of electors composed of municipal and municipal district presidents, vice-presidents and councilors, among others. The first time a representative from the province was elected through popular vote was during the succeeding 1938 Philippine legislative election after the passage of Commonwealth Act No. 44 in 1936 which removed the restrictions on qualified voters in the former Bureau of Non-Christian Tribes-designated jurisdiction.

Lanao was also represented in the Second Republic National Assembly by two members during the Pacific War. It reverted to single-member representation for the restored Commonwealth and subsequent Third Republic House of Representatives. It continued to elect representatives until it was made obsolete by the 1959 division of Lanao into two provinces with separate congressional districts beginning in 1961.

Representation history

See also
Legislative districts of Lanao del Norte
Legislative districts of Lanao del Sur

References

Former congressional districts of the Philippines
Politics of Lanao del Norte
Politics of Lanao del Sur
1935 establishments in the Philippines
1959 disestablishments in the Philippines
At-large congressional districts of the Philippines
Congressional districts of Northern Mindanao
Congressional districts of Bangsamoro
Constituencies established in 1935
Constituencies established in 1959